Chelonoidis niger duncanensis, commonly known as the Pinzón Island giant tortoise, is a subspecies of Galápagos tortoise endemic to Pinzón Island in the Galápagos.

Population history
Although relatively undisturbed by whalers, fairly large numbers of tortoises were removed by expeditions in the latter half of the 19th century and the early 20th. After the introduction of black rats (Rattus rattus) and brown rats (Rattus norvegicus) some time before 1900, no natural breeding succeeded. Since 1965, eggs have been transported to the Charles Darwin Research Station for hatching and rearing. Over 75% of those released between 1970 and 1990 survived. There are currently around  known individuals, which live in the southwestern side of Pinzón Island.

Description
This saddle-backed species is one of the smallest of the Galápagos tortoises. Its brownish-gray, oblong carapace has only a very shallow cervical indentation, the anterior marginals little to much upturned, and the slightly serrated posterior marginals flared and upturned. The carapace is usually compressed or narrowed anteriorly.

References

 Pritchard, 1996 : The Galápagos Tortoises: Nomenclatural and Survival Status. Chelonian Research Monographs, .

Chelonoidis
Subspecies
Taxa named by Samuel Garman
Endemic reptiles of the Galápagos Islands
Reptiles described in 1917